Sarsaul is a town in Kanpur district in the state of Uttar Pradesh, India. 
Sarsaul	is a Development Block in Kanpur nagar tehsil and comes under Kanpur metropolitan area.

Sarsaul is well connected by road. National Highway 19 (India) passes through Sarsaul connecting it to Kanpur city and Allahabad. Sarsaul has a railway station on New Delhi-Howrah railroad. The nearest airport is Kanpur Airport. Now The kanpur central jail is going to be constructed near sarsaul.

References

Cities and towns in Kanpur Nagar district